This was the first edition of the tournament.

Petra Kvitová won the title, defeating Eugenie Bouchard in the final, 6–3, 6–4 in a rematch of the Wimbledon final earlier that year

With Serena Williams retiring due to illness in the second round, Alizé Cornet thus became the first woman since Justine Henin in 2007 to record three victories over Williams in one year.

Seeds 
The top eight seeds received a bye into the second round.

Draw

Finals

Top half

Section 1

Section 2

Bottom half

Section 3

Section 4

Qualifying

Seeds

Qualifiers

Lucky loser

Qualifying draw

First qualifier

Second qualifier

Third qualifier

Fourth qualifier

Fifth qualifier

Sixth qualifier

Seventh qualifier

Eighth qualifier

References

External links 
 Main draw
 Qualifying draw

Singles